František Reichel (27 January 1938 – 20 November 2020) was a Czech politician who served as Deputy Prime Minister of Czechoslovakia from 1989 to 1990.

References

1938 births
2020 deaths
Czech politicians
KDU-ČSL politicians
Politicians from Prague
Prague University of Economics and Business alumni